Bombarder (trans. Bomber)  is a Serbian and former Yugoslav speed/thrash metal band. Bombarder was originally formed in 1986 in Sarajevo, SR Bosnia and Herzegovina, at the time part of SFR Yugoslavia. During the Bosnian War, during which guitarist Maho Šiljdedić lost his life, vocalist Nenad Kovačević moved to Serbia, where he reformed Bombarder in the new lineup.

Discography

Studio albums
 (1989)
 (1989)
 (1995)
 (1997)
 (2003)
 (2010)
 (2016)

Compilation albums
 (2000)

Video albums
Bombarder: Sarajevo - Novi Sad (1991)

References
Bombarder biography at serbianmetal.org

External links
Official MySpace
Bombarder at Last.fm
Bombarder at Discogs

Serbian thrash metal musical groups
Yugoslav heavy metal musical groups
Speed metal musical groups
Musical groups from Belgrade
Musical groups established in 1986
1986 establishments in Yugoslavia